Very Important Person (retitled A Coming Out Party in the United States) is a 1961 British comedy film directed by Ken Annakin and written by Jack Davies and Henry Blyth. The cast includes several well-known British comedy and character actors, including James Robertson Justice, Stanley Baxter in a dual role as a dour Scottish prisoner and a German prisoner-of-war camp officer, Eric Sykes, John Le Mesurier, Leslie Phillips and Richard Wattis.

The film had its world premiere on 20 April 1961 at the Leicester Square Theatre in London's West End and went on general release in late May on Rank's second string National circuit.

It was released in the U.S. as Coming-Out Party.

Plot
Sir Ernest Pease (James Robertson Justice), a brilliant but acerbic scientist, is the subject of a television programme based on This Is Your Life during which he is re-united with past acquaintances. He does not remember the senior British Army officer at all! A flashback ensues.

In 1942, Pease is in charge of very important aircraft research during the Second World War. He needs to take a trip on a bomber to gain first-hand knowledge of the environment under which his special equipment is to be used. However, no one must know who he is. He goes as Lieutenant Farrow, a Royal Navy public relations officer. The bomber is hit over Germany and, ignoring a crewman's warning, Pease is sucked out through a hole in the side of the aeroplane, but parachutes safely to the ground.

He is captured and sent to a prisoner of war camp mostly occupied by Royal Air Force officers. His excellent command of German causes him to be suspected of being a spy, but when his real identity becomes known to Group Captain Travers (Norman Bird), the senior British officer, he informs the men in his hut of his importance and that his escape is a top priority. Among Pease's roommates are Jimmy Cooper (Leslie Phillips), "Jock" Everett (Stanley Baxter), and "Bonzo" Baines (Jeremy Lloyd).

Pease is offered an opportunity to escape through a tunnel with two other men. However, he expects the pair to be easily recaptured (which does in fact occur). He instead plans to go into hiding after a fake escape attempt. He presumes the Germans will search for him for two weeks then presume he has got away, at which point they will step down the search and he can more safely escape.

When the Germans eventually assume he has succeeded in getting away and lose interest, he will walk out of the camp, disguised as one of three visiting Swiss Red Cross observers, along with Cooper and Baines (which has echoes of a real Second World War escape from Spangenberg by RAF officers Dominic Bruce, the "Medium Sized Man" of Colditz fame; Pete Tunstall; and "Useless" Eustace Newborn, who escaped dressed as Swiss Red Cross doctors). Crucial to the plan is that Everett looks like the camp Lager (compound) officer, Major Stampfel (also played by Baxter, even though he describes him as "hideously ugly"). He must impersonate Stampfel, as he will be escorting the delegation. The escape committee, headed by Wing Commander Piggott (John Le Mesurier), are very dissatisfied with Pease's plan, but Pease is determined to see it through. The plan nearly comes unstuck at the last moment, when another prisoner, "Grassy" Green (John Forrest), is revealed as an astute undercover Luftwaffe intelligence officer. He takes them at gunpoint, but mistakes Everett for Stampfel and is "dealt with". Pease, Cooper and Baines  walk out of the camp and eventually make their way back home.

Returning to the television programme, Pease is reunited with Baines, now a leading designer of ladies' foundation garments; Cooper, a missionary in India; Everett, a West London undertaker; and Stampfel, who has become a popular entertainment manager at a British holiday camp.

Cast

 James Robertson Justice – Sir Ernest Pease, aka Lt. Farrow RN
 Leslie Phillips – Jimmy Cooper
 Stanley Baxter – "Jock" Everett / Major Stampfel
 Eric Sykes – Willoughby, Sports Officer
 Richard Wattis – Woodcock, Entertainments Officer
 Godfrey Winn – Himself
 Colin Gordon – Briggs
 John Le Mesurier – Piggott, head of the escape committee
 Norman Bird – Travers
 Jeremy Lloyd – "Bonzo" Baines
 John Forrest – "Grassy" Green
 Jean Cadell – Lady telling story on the TV show in the opening scene
 Peter Myers – Shaw
 Ronnie Stevens – Hankley
 Ronald Leigh-Hunt – Clynes
 Steve Plytas – Luftwaffe officer
 John Ringham – Plum Pouding
 Joseph Furst – Luftwaffe interrogator
 Norman Shelley – Fred Whittaker
 Brian Oulton – 1st scientist in corridor
 Frederick Piper – 2nd scientist in corridor
 Joan Haythorne – Miss Rogers, Pease's secretary

Inspiration
The escape plan, to walk out of the camp dressed as Red Cross observers, was used in real life. It was briefly mentioned in Paul Brickhill's book The Great Escape.

There were in fact two such 'Swiss Commission' escapes from German POW camps holding RAF prisoners – Oflag IXA/H, Spangenberg, in 1941, and Oflag VIB, Warburg, in 1942.  The escape in Very Important Person is based on the latter, which was an Army–RAF joint effort, and not the one mentioned by Paul Brickhill.  Both escapes are described by Charles Rollings in his books Wire and Walls and Wire and Worse.

The film's screenplay was later made into a novelisation with the same title by John Foley, which has erroneously caused John Foley to sometimes be credited as author of the novel upon which the film is based. However, it was the other way around: his novel is based on the film.

Trivia
The Windmill Theatre mentioned at the end of the film was a famous variety and revue theatre which featured tableaux vivants similar to the Folies Bergère and Moulin Rouge in Paris. It continued to operated throughout WWII despite blackouts and the Blitz on London, and boasted "We Never Closed."

Critical reception
The New York Times described the film as "trifling, even as modest British comedies go," and "burdened, rather than helped, by the presence of James Robertson Justice in a ponderous role," though Leslie Phillips and Stanley Baxter were found to be "particularly droll." The Radio Times however, noted a "winning comedy" with "witty script", "polished playing" - "Stanley Baxter gives one of his best film performances" - and "deft comic support from Leslie Phillips, Eric Sykes and the deliciously deadpan Richard Wattis."

References

External links 
 
 
 
 
 

1960s war comedy films
1961 films
British aviation films
British war comedy films
1960s English-language films
Films directed by Ken Annakin
World War II aviation films
World War II prisoner of war films
Military humor in film
1961 comedy films
1960s British films